Hunch may refer to:

 Hunch (website), a collective intelligence decision making system
 Hunch, an intuitive reckoning
 Hunch, a forward bend in one's body, such as that from a crushed vertebra
 Hunch, a parody of Derryn Hinch played by Steve Vizard on Australian television show Fast Forward
 Hunch, a dance attributed to Hasil Adkins
 The Hunch Backs, a mountain in Hong Kong
 , a United States Navy patrol boat in commission from 1917 to 1918